Execution Squad is a 1972 crime film directed by Steno and starring Enrico Maria Salerno. Set during Italy's tumultuous anni di piombo ("Years of Lead"), the film obtained a great commercial success.

Cast 
Enrico Maria Salerno	as	 Commissioner Bertone
Mariangela Melato	as	 Sandra
Franco Fabrizi	as	 Francesco Bettarini
Cyril Cusack	as	 Former Superintendent Stolfi
Mario Adorf	as	 Deputy Prosecutor Ricciuti 
 Laura Belli	as	Anna Maria Sprovieri 
 Jürgen Drews	as	Michele Settecamini
 Corrado Gaipa	as	Lawyer Armani

Plot
Commissioner Bertone is an upright officer in a Rome over-run by crime. Due to a justice system which protects the rights of suspects and citizens against the police, many crimes go unpunished with convictions not being obtained the criminals ending up back on the streets. However, some of the released criminals turn up dead. Bertone discovers an organized group of vigilantes are dealing with the criminals the police cannot obtain convictions for. A young criminal on the run after a bungled robbery costs the lives of two citizens is the syndicate's next victim, followed by an older criminal. The vigilantes start to target prostitutes and homosexuals active on the streets at night, as well as a trade union leader who was accused of killing a policeman during a riot, and even a criminal in custody. Bertone tries to bring the second kid involved in the robbery to justice legally, but the self-appointed executioners are closing in and his own officers are sympathetic to the 'clean up squad'.

Style
Italian film historian Roberto Curti stated that many critics have consider Execution Squad to be the initiator of the "poliziottesco" film genre. Curti opined that Execution Squad was just a logical continuation of Damiano Damiani's Confessions of a Police Captain. The film is credited to Stefano Vanzina, the first time in his career that Vanzina had abandoned his usual credit of Steno which he had used since 1949. The film is also a drastic change from Steno's usual output which consisted primarily of comedy films.

Production
The script and story were written by Lucio De Caro and Steno. Steno stated that the script was originally written for a different director, but "back then my colleagues were afraid to speak ill of the police". The lead role in the film was given to Enrico Maria Salerno, but was originally offered to Lando Buzzanca, one of Italy's most famous comedians at the time. The film was shot at Centro Incom in Rome and on location in Rome.

Release
Execution Squad was released in Italy on 25 February 1972 where it was distributed by P.A.C. It grossed a total of 1,696,360,000 Italian lire on its domestic release. Curti described the film as an unexpected box office hit in Italy. It was released in West Germany on 17 November 1972 as Das Syndikat.

See also
 List of Italian films of 1972

Footnotes

References

External links

1972 films
1970s crime thriller films
Italian crime thriller films
West German films
Italian vigilante films
Poliziotteschi films
Films set in Rome
Films directed by Stefano Vanzina
Films scored by Stelvio Cipriani
1970s Italian films